Mario Uriel Méndez, commonly known as El Cholito (born January 5, 1977 in David, Chiriquí) is a retired Panamanian football defender and currently is a manager.

Playing career

Club
In Panama, Méndez played for Chiriquí, Tauro, Chorrillo, whom he joined in January 2006 from San Francisco, and Atlético Chiriquí. In 2004, he had the opportunity to go to trial to Vasco da Gama but hurt his Achilles tendon in Julio Dely Valdés and Jorge Dely Valdés farewell game.

International
Méndez made his debut for Panama in an August 1996 friendly match against Honduras and has earned a total of 33 caps, scoring 4 goals. He represented his country in 8 FIFA World Cup qualification matches and El Cholito was part of the Panama squad that participated in the UNCAF Nations Cup 2003 held in Guatemala.

His final international was an August 2003 friendly match against Paraguay.

International goals
Scores and results list Panama's goal tally first.

Managerial career
Shortly after retiring in 2008, Méndez became the manager of Atlético Chiriquí (the only team in the Liga Panameña de Fútbol Chiriquí). In the 2009 Apertura I championship, he led Atlético Chiriquí to their first qualification to the semifinals round after being 2nd in the general table. Unfortunately for Cholito, they lost on aggregate score to San Francisco. In August 2011 he became assistant to Miguel Mansilla at Chorrillo after he was dismissed as manager of the Panama U-20's.

In May 2012 he returned at the helm at Atlético Chiriquí, only to resign in March 2013.

References

External links

1977 births
Living people
People from David District
Association football defenders
Panamanian footballers
Panama international footballers
1997 UNCAF Nations Cup players
2003 UNCAF Nations Cup players
Chiriquí FC players
Tauro F.C. players
San Francisco F.C. players
Unión Deportivo Universitario players
Atlético Chiriquí players
Panamanian football managers
Central American Games silver medalists for Panama
Central American Games medalists in football